The 2019 Southern Conference softball tournament was held at Frost Stadium on the campus of the University of Tennessee at Chattanooga in Chattanooga, Tennessee, from May 8 through May 11, 2019.  won their fourteenth tournament championship and earned the SoCon's automatic bid to the 2019 NCAA Division I softball tournament.

Bracket

References

Southern Conference Tournament
Southern Conference softball tournament
Southern Conference Tournament